The following is a list of CAF club competition winning coaches that includes winning coaches over the years in the different competitions (or Cups) held by CAF. The Confederation of African Football (CAF) is the governing body for football leagues across Africa, in which African National football teams take part. It governs prize awards, as well as other administrative tasks.

CAF Champions League

By year

Multiple winners

By nationality

CAF Confederation Cup

Multiple Winners

By Nationality

CAF Super Cup

Defunct Competitions

CAF Cup Winner's Cup

CAF Cup

See also

References

Confederation of African Football trophies and awards]